The 2021 Supercopa de España de Baloncesto, also known as Supercopa Endesa for sponsorship reasons, was the 18th edition of the Supercopa de España de Baloncesto, an annual basketball competition for clubs in the Spanish basketball league system that were successful in its major competitions in the preceding season.

Real Madrid defended successfully the title and conquered its fourth consecutive Supercup, 8th overall.

All times were in Western European Summer Time (UTC+01:00).

Qualification 
The tournament featured the winners from the three major competitions (2020–21 Liga Endesa, 2021 Copa del Rey and 2020 Supercopa Endesa), the host team and the remaining highest ranked teams from the 2020–21 Liga Endesa season if vacant berths exist.

Qualified teams 
The following four teams qualified for the tournament.

Venue 
On July 16, 2021, ACB selected and announced Tenerife to host the supercup on September 2021. The venue can hold 5,100 people for basketball games, and it offers 2,000 square meters of floor space. The facilities remain open all year long, without interruption. The pavilion also provides the following facilities for athletic use: 5 large locker rooms and 4 double locker rooms. Additionally, a gymnasium, infirmary, video and press room are available as well as a rehab room for athletes. The arena hosted the 2017 Champions League Final Four, as Iberostar Tenerife hosted the tournament in which Tenerife won its first Champions League title. The arena also hosted the 2017 Intercontinental Cup final match between Tenerife and Guaros de Lara. The arena was also used a host venue of the 2018 Women's World Cup, and the 2020 Intercontinental Cup. The arena previously hosted the supercup in 2020.

Draw 
The draw was held on 17 August 2021. Barça as the league and cup champion and Real Madrid as supercup champion were the seeded teams.

Bracket

Semifinals

Barça vs. Valencia Basket

Lenovo Tenerife vs. Real Madrid

Final

References

External links 
 Official website 

Supercopa de España de Baloncesto
2021–22 in Spanish basketball
September 2021 sports events in Spain